Lycée Français Liberté de Bamako or the Etablissement Liberté is a French international school in Bamako, Mali. The school has a primary school, a junior high school ("collège") and a senior high school (lycée).
This school follows the French program defined by the French ministry of national education.

References

External links
  Etablissement Liberté de Bamako
  fiche wikipédia sur l'établissement Liberté

French international schools in Africa
International schools in Mali
Bamako